Pediopsis is a genus of true bugs belonging to the family Cicadellidae.

The genus has almost cosmopolitan distribution.

Species:
 Pediopsis bannaensis
 Pediopsis bicolor

References

Cicadellidae
Hemiptera genera